Gatwick Airport railway station is on the Brighton Main Line in West Sussex, England. It serves Gatwick Airport,  down the line from  via . The station is also connected to the airport's North Terminal by the Airport Shuttle people-mover. Gatwick Airport was the busiest station in South East England from 2017 to 2018.

The first railway station, Gatwick, opened in September 1891. In 1946, it was renamed Gatwick Racecourse, to reflect its association with the neighbouring Gatwick Racecourse, but fell out of use for a decade after the opening of Tinsley Green station, which was renamed Gatwick Airport in September 1935. The stations had a reversal of fortunes in the 1950s as a result of a government decision to expand and develop the Beehive airport terminal into London's second airport. Gatwick Racecourse station was rebuilt to serve Gatwick Airport, and is integrated into its terminal. On 27 May 1958, the rebuilt station, which took over the name Gatwick Airport, was opened in conjunction with a regular train service; and services to Tinsley Green were discontinued.

Train services are provided by Southern, Gatwick Express, Thameslink and Great Western Railway. When viewed from the air (or in satellite imagery), the station's British Rail logo etched on the roof is visible. Between late 2010 and early 2014, new facilities were built at the station, among them platform 7; infrastructure was renewed and the concourse was refurbished. The station was one of 18 managed by Network Rail, but, in 2012, management was transferred to Southern. In May 2018, the station was named as the second-least popular major station in the UK.

History

Gatwick/Gatwick Racecourse Station
In September 1891, Gatwick station was constructed on the present site to serve Gatwick Racecourse, but operated only on race days. The facilities included passing loops and sidings, which enabled race trains to be held without impeding regular traffic on the Brighton Main Line. During the First World War, the sidings were extended to accommodate munitions trains heading for Newhaven.

In 1946, Gatwick station was renamed Gatwick Racecourse until 1958. The station had fallen out of regular use after the opening of nearby Tinsley Green/Gatwick Airport Station. In the early 1950s, the airport was expanded over land formerly occupied by the racecourse, and it was decided to rebuild the station. The station was integrated into the airport terminal via an upper level concourse designed by British Rail Southern Region. On 27 May 1958, the rebuilt station, Gatwick Airport, opened with a regular train service.

Tinsley Green/Gatwick Airport Station

Within a year it was renamed Gatwick Airport, following the completion of the Beehive airport terminal, which had a direct subway connection to the station. In 1940, the airport was requisitioned by the Royal Air Force (RAF) for military use. In 1952, the government decided to expand the airport as London's second airport. The station continued in operation until 27 May 1958 when the new Gatwick Airport station (above) opened. The old station was later demolished. The only visible remains of the old station are sections of the former up slow line platform and sections of the subway between the station and the original terminal building.

Present station
The 1958 facilities included a parcels office beneath the main concourse, lifts and a corridor on the south side of the overbridge, separated from the passenger corridor by a glazed partition. The ticket office on the main concourse of the station was able to handle 670 separate issues of Edmondson tickets from its Bellmatic equipment. The signalbox was retained on the centre platform. In the 1980s, the station was refurbished. The station had six platforms immediately beneath the airport's South Terminal.

The ticket office is staffed for ticket sales and enquiries, supplemented by ticket machines capable of handling online bookings usually available on a round-the-clock basis. Automated teller machines, payphones and e-mail access points are installed on the main concourse. There are coin-operated trolleys for luggage and a left luggage facility. On-site food and drink outlets are present. Toilets are available and baby changing facilities and additional toilets can be found in the adjacent South Terminal. There is no car parking facility. Transport for London's (TfL) Oyster cards and contactless cards are accepted for travel at the station.

Redevelopment

On 13 October 2010, a £53 million redevelopment programme was announced to provide another platform capable of accommodating 12-car trains,  refurbishment of the concourse, and track and signal upgrades. Escalators and lifts were provided for platforms 5 and 6, replacing a staircase to achieve improved circulation. The redevelopment provided improved capacity and flexibility on the Brighton Main Line. The project was jointly financed by Network Rail, who contributed £44.9 million, and Gatwick Airport who provided £7.9 million. Construction was structured so as not to negatively affect the 2012 Summer Paralympics, which was hosted in London.

By 3 February 2014, completion was marked by a ceremony officiated by Minister of State for Transport Baroness Kramer, who formally opened the new platform. Constructed by VolkerFitzpatrick, platform 7 is served by a  loop from the down fast line and used by services which formerly used at platform 5. VolkerFitzpatrick were responsible for track and signalling modifications. This has allowed platforms 5 and 6 to be dedicated to Gatwick Express services, thereby eliminating previous conflicts with slower services when they crossed to platforms 1 and 2. The project was finished on schedule and budget, despite extreme weather conditions during the winter of 2013/2014.

In 2014, Baroness Kramer announced that the government had committed £50 million towards further improvements. A scheme for further improvements, estimated to cost around £120 million, was announced by Network Rail. In April 2018, Network Rail submitted a planning application for modernising the station; doubling the size of the concourse, widening two platforms, and improving connections to the airport terminal. It was done in partnership with Gatwick Airport authorities, the Coast to Capital local enterprise partnership and the Department for Transport. The expansion is an element of a five-year programme, costed at £1.11 billion, announced by Gatwick Airport in early 2018.

Construction on the new concourse began in November 2020. The project is expected to be completed by 2023.

Services
As of May 2022, train services at Gatwick Airport are operated by Southern, Gatwick Express, Thameslink and Great Western Railway:

Platforms 1 and 2: Services to London Victoria and to Bedford via Redhill and Peterborough
Platform 3: Great Western Railway services to Reading
Platform 4: Services to London Victoria, London Bridge, Bedford and Cambridge
Platform 5: Northbound services to London Victoria (including Gatwick Express services) and interchangeable with Platform 4
Platform 6: Southbound services to Brighton (Gatwick Express), Southampton Central, Bognor Regis, Portsmouth & Southsea and Littlehampton and interchangeable with Platform 7
Platform 7: Southbound services to Brighton (Thameslink), Ore and Eastbourne

Services at the station are as follows:

Southern 
The typical off-peak service in trains per hour is:
 6 tph to 
 2 tph to  via 

During the peak hours and on Saturdays, the service between London Victoria and Littlehampton is increased to 2 tph and the service between London Victoria and Ore is supplemented with an additional hourly service between London Victoria and Eastbourne.

On Sundays, a London Victoria to Brighton service runs half hourly.

Southern services at Gatwick Airport are operated using  EMUs.

Gatwick Express
The typical off-peak service in trains per hour is:

Gatwick Express services are operated using  EMUs.

Thameslink 
The typical off-peak service in trains per hour is:
 4 tph to  via London Bridge
 2 tph to 
 2 tph to  via 
 2 tph to Three Bridges 
Thameslink services at Gatwick Airport are operated using  EMUs.

Great Western Railway 
The typical off-peak service in trains per hour is:
 1 tph to  via 
Great Western Railway services at Gatwick Airport are operated using  and  DMUs.

References

External links

Buildings and structures in Crawley
Transport in Crawley
Railway stations in West Sussex
DfT Category B stations
Former Southern Railway (UK) stations
Railway stations in Great Britain opened in 1935
Railway stations in Great Britain closed in 1958
Former London, Brighton and South Coast Railway stations
Railway stations in Great Britain opened in 1891
Railway stations in Great Britain opened in 1958
Railway stations served by Govia Thameslink Railway
Railway stations served by Great Western Railway
Airport railway stations in the United Kingdom
Gatwick Airport
1891 establishments in England